Georgia elected its members October 4, 1824. There were only 7 candidates who ran statewide in 1824. There were several other candidates who received votes in a small number of counties, but vote totals were only available for the seven winning candidates. The minor candidates only received a few hundred votes each.

See also 
 1824 Georgia's at-large congressional district special election
 1824 and 1825 United States House of Representatives elections
 List of United States representatives from Georgia

Notes 

1824
Georgia
United States House of Representatives